The term data reliability may refer to:
Reliability (statistics), the overall consistency of a measure
Data integrity, the maintenance of, and the assurance of the accuracy and consistency of, data over its entire life-cycle